Victor C. Waryas (February 28, 1915 – November 2, 1976) was an American politician who served in the New York State Assembly from 1965 to 1968.

He died on November 2, 1976, in Poughkeepsie, New York at age 61.

References

1915 births
1976 deaths
Democratic Party members of the New York State Assembly
20th-century American politicians